Darrett B. Rutman (4 March 1929 – 11 April 1997) was a historian of early America. He received his Ph.D. from the University of Virginia in 1959.  He was a distinguished scholar and served on the History faculties of the University of Minnesota, 1959–1968, the University of New Hampshire, 1968–1984, and the University of Florida in Gainesville, 1984-1996.  He died of an aortic aneurysm on April 11, 1997.

Several of his books were co-authored by his wife, Anita H. Rutman.

Bibliography
 American Puritanism: faith and practice, Darrett B. Rutman (1970, reprinted 1977) 
The Great Awakening: event and exegesis, edited by Darrett B. Rutman (1970) 
Husbandmen of Plymouth: farms and villages in the Old Colony, 1620-1692, Darrett B. Rutman (1967)
The morning of America, 1603-1789, Darrett B. Rutman (1971) 
The Old Dominion: essays for Thomas Perkins Abernethy, Rutman, Darrett B. (1964)
 A Place in Time: Middlesex County, Virginia 1650-1750, by Darrett B. Rutman, Anita H. Rutman (1984) 
 A Place in Time: Explicatus, by Darrett B. Rutman, Anita H. Rutman (1984) 
Small worlds, large questions: explorations in early American social history, 1600-1850, Darrett B. Rutman with Anita H. Rutman (1994) 
 Rutman, Darrett B. Winthrop's Boston: Portrait of a Puritan Town, 1630-1649, (1965) 

1929 births
1997 deaths
Deaths from aortic aneurysm
University of Florida faculty
20th-century American historians
American male non-fiction writers
20th-century American male writers